Sean Schemmel (born November 21, 1968) is an American voice actor, ADR director and screenwriter known chiefly for his work in cartoons, anime and video games. His most notable voice role has been the adult version of Son Goku in the Funimation dub of the Dragon Ball franchise. He has worked for Funimation, OkraTron 5000, NYAV Post, Central Park Media, 4K Media Inc. and DuArt Film & Video.

Career
Initially, Schemmel never planned on becoming a voice actor; he trained to be a classical French horn player. When a friend persuaded him to audition for Dragon Ball Z, he tried out for a minor character who was going to be killed in the first season of the show. He had been recording for two weeks before he was told that he was going to be the lead. Since being cast as Son Goku by Funimation in 1999, he has been the most consistent English voice actor for the main protagonist of the Dragon Ball franchise, having voiced the character's older teen and adult incarnations in every anime series produced to date (Dragon Ball, Z, GT, Kai and Super) and most Dragon Ball animated movies and video games, as well as other characters such as King Kai and Goku Black.

Besides voicing Goku, Schemmel has lent his voice to several other anime characters including Conrad in Berserk,  Amidamaru in Shaman King (2001), Lucario in Pokémon and Elliot Grant in Mew Mew Power. His other roles in animation include  Firefly in G.I. Joe: Sigma 6, Gonard in Kappa Mikey and Hawkman in DC Super Friends. In video games, Schemmel has provided his voice to Makuta in Bionicle, Black Doom in Shadow the Hedgehog, Maxwell in Bullet Witch, Horace in Skullgirls, Batman in The Dark Knight Rises, Sun Wukong (whom Goku was originally based on) in Smite, and Marc Wilson in Fallout 4.

In addition to his voice acting career, Schemmel was also an ADR Director and scriptwriter for NYAV Post, where he had directed and adapted for English dubs of several Japanese anime series. In the field of narration, he has won two awards for his audiobook recordings.

Personal life
In 1993, Schemmel married Melissa Cox. The couple got separated in 1998. He married actress Melodee Lenz the same year. They divorced after three years of being together in 2001.

Filmography

Anime

Animation

Video games

Awards

References

External links

 
 
 
 
 

Living people
American male screenwriters
American male television writers
American male video game actors
American male voice actors
American television writers
American voice directors
Funimation
Male actors from Los Angeles
Screenwriters from California
University of North Texas alumni
20th-century American male actors
21st-century American male actors
1968 births